The Jubilee Medal "XX Years of the Workers' and Peasants' Red Army" was a state military commemorative medal of the Soviet Union established on January 24, 1938 by decree of the Presidium of the Supreme Soviet of the USSR to denote the twentieth anniversary of the creation of the Soviet Armed Forces.

Medal Statute 
The Jubilee Medal "XX Years of the Workers' and Peasants' Red Army" was awarded to staff and commanding officers of the Workers' and Peasants' Red Army and Navy who had, as of February 23, 1938 (the Day of the Red Army), served for 20 years in its ranks, and to those honoured during the Civil War and the war for freedom and independence of the motherland in units of the Workers' and Peasants' Red Army and Navy; to those awarded the Order of the Red Banner for distinguished service during the Civil War.

The time served in the units and detachments of the Red Guards and the Red guerrilla groups that operated against the enemies of Soviet power between 1917 and 1921 counted towards award of the medal.

The Jubilee Medal "XX Years of the Workers' and Peasants' Red Army" was worn on the left side of the chest and when in the presence of other medals of the USSR, it was located immediately after the Medal "For Tapping of the Subsoil and Expansion of the Petrochemical Complex of Western Siberia".

Medal description 

The Jubilee Medal "XX Years of the Workers' and Peasants' Red Army" is a 32 mm in diameter oxidised silver matte finished circular medal with a polished 2.5 mm rim.  On the obverse, a large red enamelled five pointed star with a silvered edge, the tip of each point reaching the medal's edge; at the bottom sitting on the rim, in deep relief, the prominent 8 mm high gilded Roman numeral "XX" going up between the star's lower rays to superimpose it over 4 mm.
 
On the reverse, a 25 mm high relief image of a Red Army soldier clad in the winter uniform of the Red Guard and firing a rifle, at the lower right side of the soldier, the dates "1918-1938".
  
From its establishment in 1938 to 1943, the medal was secured by a ring through the medal suspension loop to a small rectangular mount covered by a red silk moiré ribbon.  In 1943, this changed to the now standard Soviet pentagonal mount, now covered by a 24 mm wide silk moiré grey ribbon with a 2 mm red edge stripe on each side.

Recipients (partial list) 
From January 1938 to the end of December 1940, 32,127 people received the medal.

All individuals listed below are recipients of the Jubilee Medal "XX Years of the Workers' and Peasants' Red Army".
General Secretary of the Central Committee of the All-Union Communist Party (Bolsheviks) Joseph Vissarionovich Stalin
Marshal of the Soviet Union and Defence Minister Kliment Yefremovich Voroshilov
Admiral of the Fleet Nikolay Gerasimovich Kuznetsov
Marshal of the Soviet Union Alexander Ilyich Yegorov
Marshal of the Soviet Union  Andrey Ivanovich Yeryomenko
Colonel General Yakov Timofeyevich Cherevichenko
Admiral Lev Mikhailovich Galler
Major General Vladimir Vasilevich Kirpichnikov
Marshal of Aviation Fedor Yakovlevich Falaleyev
Colonel General Valerian Alexandrovich Frolov
Lieutenant General Nikolai Pavlovich Simoniak
Lieutenant General Nikolai Nikolaevich Vashugin
Marshal of the Soviet Union Georgy Konstantinovich Zhukov
Marshal of the Soviet Union Semyon Konstantinovich Timoshenko
Marshal of the Soviet Union Vasily Ivanovich Chuikov
Marshal of the Soviet Union Semyon Mikhailovich Budyonny
Marshal of the Soviet Union Vasily Konstantinovich Blyukher
Marshal of the Soviet Union Boris Mikhailovitch Shaposhnikov
Marshal of the Soviet Union Aleksandr Vasilevsky
Marshal of the Soviet Union Ivan Stepanovich Konev
Marshal of the Soviet Union Leonid Aleksandrovich Govorov
Marshal of the Soviet Union Konstantin Konstantinovich Rokossovskiy
Marshal of the Soviet Union Rodion Yakovlevich Malinovsky
Marshal of the Soviet Union Fyodor Ivanovich Tolbukhin
Marshal of the Soviet Union Kirill Afanasievich Meretskov
Marshal of the Soviet Union Vasily Danilovich Sokolovsky
Marshal of the Soviet Union Andrei Antonovich Grechko
Marshal of the Soviet Union Andrey Ivanovich Yeryomenko
Marshal of the Soviet Union Kirill Semyonovich Moskalenko
Marshal of the Soviet Union Matvei Vasilevich Zakharov
Admiral Arseniy Grigoriyevich Golovko
Admiral Vladimir Filippovich Tributs
Admiral Gordey Ivanovich Levchenko
Admiral Filipp Sergeyevich Oktyabrskiy
Army General Ivan Yefimovich Petrov
Major General Ivan Vasilyevich Panfilov
Lieutenant General Ivan Vasilyevich Panfilov
Marshal of the Soviet Union Pavel Fyodorovich Batitsky
Army General Ivan Vladimirovich Tyulenev
Rear Admiral Ivan Dmitrievich Papanin

See also 
Russian Civil War
Red Army
Awards and decorations of the Russian Federation
Awards and decorations of the Soviet Union

References

External links 
 Legal Library of the USSR

Military awards and decorations of the Soviet Union
1938 establishments in the Soviet Union
Awards established in 1938